4Minute World is the fifth extended play by South Korean girl group 4Minute, released on March 17, 2014. It features the lead single "Whatcha Doin' Today".

Promotion and release 
On March 8, the lead single was confirmed to be "Whatcha Doin' Today" The lead single video was released on March 16 under the title "오늘 뭐해 (Whatcha Doin' Today)" and the full EP was released on March 17.

"Whatcha Doin' Today" reached number 1 on the weekly Gaon Digital Chart and number 4 on the Billboard Korea K-Pop Hot 100.

On June 18, 2014 the group released the music video for the track "Thank You" to celebrate their fifth anniversary.

Track listing

Charts

Album

Sales and certifications

References

4Minute EPs
Cube Entertainment EPs
2014 EPs
Korean-language EPs
Dance-pop EPs